The 2017 Asia-Pacific Rally Championship season was an international rally championship sanctioned by the FIA. The championship was contested by a combination of regulations with Group R competing directly against Super 2000 cars for points.

The championship began in New Zealand on 28 April and concluded in India on 26 November. It was held over five rallies. A sixth rally, the third round, Zhangye Rally scheduled to be held in China was cancelled.

The championship was won for the third time by the reigning champion, Indian driver Gaurav Gill driving a Škoda Fabia R5. Gill had previously won the championship in 2013 and 2016. Gill was first or second in each of the five rallies, winning his home rally the Coffee Day Rally as well as rallies in New Zealand and Japan. His Team MRF team mate, Norwegian rallyist Ole Christian Veiby was runner up in the championship, taking the remain two victories in Australia and Malaysia. Swedish driver Robert Blomberg was third in the title driving a Mitsubishi Mirage R5. Blomberg finished ahead of Veiby in Japan, the only APRC driver to beat either Team MRF Škoda driver. Veiby won the Pacific Cup held over just the two Pacific division rallies  after New Caledonia was dropped from the schedule two years ago. Gill won the Asian cup held over the three events held in the Asian division.

Event calendar and results
The 2017 APRC is as follows:

Championship standings
The 2017 APRC for Drivers points was as follows:

Note: 1 – 14 refers to the bonus points awarded for each leg of the rally for the first five place getters, 1st (7), 2nd (5), 3rd (3), 4th (2), 5th (1). There were two bonus legs for each rally.

Pacific Cup

Asia Cup

References

External links

APRC Live Podcast
APRC News and Video

Asia-Pacific Rally Championship seasons
Asia-Pacific
Asia-Pacific
Asia-Pacific